The French National Monotype was a sailing event on the Sailing at the 1924 Summer Olympics program in Meulan. A program of elimination and semi-finals and, where needed, sail-offs were scheduled. 17 sailors from 17 nation competed using eight boats The eight boats were provided by the French Olympic Committee. A rotation scheme was used to accommodate all 17 sailors. The sails were swapped so that every sailor used the same sail number every time. The windvane on top of the mast was in the colors of the sailor's national flag.

Race schedule
In this class a total of 17 competitors participated. The France Olympic Committee had made available a total of 8 mostly identical boats. So here the fleet was divided in two flights of eight. In each elimination series one country was exempt and was automatically qualified for the semi final. Per flight the best two boats earned a place in the semi final. Finally a sail off was held for the places 2–4.

Course area and course configuration

Weather conditions

Results

Poules 
For the elimination series four poules were formed:

Elimination series

Final results 
Competitors who scored a first or a second place in the elimination series or were exempt in one of the races were qualified (Q) for the semi-finals.

RET (M) Hit Mark
DSQ (M) Hit Mark
DSQ (C) Collision
ABN Abandonend

Daily standings

Notes 
Since Norway won from Finland and Finland from Spain in the first semi final and since Finland won from Spain and Spain from Norway in the second semi final there was a tie between those countries. This tie was broken by a Sail-off (Race 5).

Other information

Sailors
During the Sailing regattas at the 1924 Summer Olympics among others the following persons were competing in the various classes:

Further reading

References 

Monotype
French National Monotype 1924